Rafael ledes Carrascal Ávilez (born 26 November 1992) is a Colombian professional footballer who plays as a defensive midfielder for América de Cali in the Liga Betplay.

Honours

Club
Alianza Petrolera
Categoría Primera B (1): 2012
Deportes Tolima
Categoría Primera A (1): 2018-I
América de Cali
Categoría Primera A (1): 2019-II
América de Cali
Categoría Primera A (1): 2020

External links
 

Living people
1984 births
People from Sucre
Colombian footballers
Alianza Petrolera players
Millonarios F.C. players
Atlético Junior footballers
Deportes Tolima footballers
Categoría Primera A players
Categoría Primera B players
Paraguayan Primera División players
Association football midfielders
Atlético Nacional footballers
América de Cali footballers
Cerro Porteño players
People from Sucre Department